Events in the year 1723 in Norway.

Incumbents
Monarch: Frederick IV

Events

8 March – The Povel Juel Plot: Povel Juel was executed in Copenhagen, for his plans to depose Frederick IV as King of Norway.
7 May – The town of Arendal was given market town privileges.
 The town of Risør was given market town privileges.

Arts and literature
 The Nærøy manuscript was made.

Births

9 May – Ludvig Daae, priest and landowner (died 1786).
24 May – Peter Ascanius, biologist (died 1803).
24 November – Jens Essendrop, clergyman, civil servant and topographical writer (died 1801).

Deaths
14 November – Axel Rosenkrantz, landowner, baron and civil servant (b 1670).

See also

References